Monroe County is a county in the U.S. state of West Virginia. As of the 2020 census, the population was 12,376. Its county seat is Union.

Monroe County was the home of Andrew Summers Rowan of Spanish–American War fame, who is immortalized in Elbert Hubbard's classic A Message to Garcia. The county was also the site of the 1928 discovery of the 34.48 carat (6.896 g) Jones Diamond by Grover C. Jones and William "Punch" Jones.

Monroe County celebrates its own holiday, Farmers' Day.

History
Monroe County was created from Greenbrier County on January 14, 1799, and was named for Virginia civic figure James Monroe, who would be elected fifth President of the United States in November 1816.  It was one of fifty Virginia counties that were admitted to the Union as the state of West Virginia on June 20, 1863, at the height of the Civil War. Monroe County did not participate in the creation of the new state, but was included by Congressional decree. Almost all the men from Monroe who served in the Civil War enlisted in the Confederate army.

In 1863, West Virginia's counties were divided into civil townships, with the intention of encouraging local government.  This proved impractical in the heavily rural state, and in 1872 the townships were converted into magisterial districts.  Monroe County was initially divided into seven townships: Forest Hill, Red Sulphur, Second Creek, Springfield, Sweet Springs, Union, and Wolf Creek.  In 1871, part of Forest Hill Township was added to the new county of Summers, and the remaining territory distributed between Red Sulphur and Springfield Townships.  The following year, the six remaining townships became magisterial districts.  Except for minor adjustments, the six historic magisterial districts were unchanged until the 1990s, when they were consolidated into three new districts: Central, Eastern, and Western.

Geography
Monroe County lies on the southeast side of West Virginia. Its southeast border abuts the northwest border of the state of Virginia. The New River flows northward for a short distance along the county's southwest border. The county's terrain is mountainous and tree-covered, with all sufficiently level surfaces devoted to agriculture. The terrain slopes to the north and west, with its highest part the middle part of its border with Virginia, at 3,862' (1177m) ASL.

Major highways

  U.S. Highway 219
  West Virginia Route 3
  West Virginia Route 12
  West Virginia Route 122
  West Virginia Route 311

Adjacent counties

 Greenbrier County (north)
 Alleghany County, Virginia (northeast)
 Craig County, Virginia (east)
 Giles County, Virginia (south)
 Summers County (west)

Watersheds
Tributaries of the James River, part of the Chesapeake Bay
 Potts Creek
Tributaries of the New River
 Greenbrier River
 Indian Creek
Tributaries of the Greenbrier River
 Second Creek
 Sinks Grove

National Natural Landmark
 Greenville Saltpeter Cave

National protected areas
 George Washington National Forest
 Jefferson National Forest  In 2018 a natural gas pipeline project entered the Jefferson National Forest.

Demographics

2000 census
As of the census of 2000, there were 14,583 people, 5,447 households, and 3,883 families in the county. The population density was 30.8/sqmi (11.9/km2). There were 7,267 housing units at an average density of 15.4/sqmi (5.93/km2). The racial makeup of the county was 92.67% White, 5.98% Black or African American, 0.23% Native American, 0.16% Asian, 0.01% Pacific Islander, 0.03% from other races, and 0.92% from two or more races.  0.49% of the population were Hispanic or Latino of any race.

There were 5,447 households, out of which 29.00% had children under the age of 18 living with them, 59.80% were married couples living together, 7.90% had a female householder with no husband present, and 28.70% were non-families. 25.80% of all households were made up of individuals, and 13.10% had someone living alone who was 65 years of age or older.  The average household size was 2.41 and the average family size was 2.88.

The county population contained 20.10% under the age of 18, 8.10% from 18 to 24, 30.30% from 25 to 44, 26.10% from 45 to 64, and 15.40% who were 65 years of age or older. The median age was 40 years. For every 100 females there were 79.70 males. For every 100 females age 18 and over, there were 73.80 males.

The median income for a household in the county was $27,575, and the median income for a family was $35,299. Males had a median income of $25,643 versus $22,104 for females. The per capita income for the county was $17,435. About 12.60% of families and 16.20% of the population were below the poverty line, including 21.30% of those under age 18 and 12.30% of those age 65 or over.

2010 census
As of the census of 2010, there were 13,502 people, 5,655 households, and 3,915 families in the county. The population density was 28.5/sqmi (11.0/km2). There were 7,601 housing units at an average density of 16.1/sqmi (6.20/km2). The racial makeup of the county was 97.5% white, 0.7% black or African American, 0.2% American Indian, 0.1% Asian, 0.2% from other races, and 1.3% from two or more races. Those of Hispanic or Latino origin made up 0.6% of the population. In terms of ancestry, 19.5% were Irish, 16.7% were English, 16.3% were German, 10.4% were American, and 5.7% were Scotch-Irish.

Of the 5,655 households, 27.4% had children under the age of 18 living with them, 55.7% were married couples living together, 9.3% had a female householder with no husband present, 30.8% were non-families, and 26.9% of all households were made up of individuals. The average household size was 2.38 and the average family size was 2.85. The median age was 45.0 years.

The median income for a household in the county was $39,574 and the median income for a family was $45,106. Males had a median income of $35,709 versus $23,782 for females. The per capita income for the county was $18,927. About 10.3% of families and 13.3% of the population were below the poverty line, including 18.1% of those under age 18 and 5.4% of those age 65 or over.

Politics
Monroe County was strongly pro-Confederate during the Virginia Secession Convention. It voted Democratic consistently up until voting for William McKinley in 1900, but since then has leaned Republican except during Democratic landslides, and like all of West Virginia has become overwhelmingly Republican in the twenty-first century due to declining unionization and differences with the Democratic Party's liberal views on social issues.

Government and infrastructure

FPC Alderson

The Federal Bureau of Prisons' Federal Prison Camp, Alderson was the nation's first women's federal prison. It is located in Monroe and Summers counties, west of Alderson.

Natural Landmarks
One of Monroe County's geological features is Haynes Cave, a former saltpeter mine. Workers in the mine found strange bones in the cave at the end of the 18th Century, and mailed them to Thomas Jefferson. Jefferson's study of the animal, the Megalonyx jeffersonii was arguably the birth of American paleontology. It is now the official West Virginia state fossil.

However, other saltpeter caves are in private ownership, and allow only limited public access due to ecological risks. One such is the Greenville Saltpeter Cave, designated a national natural landmark in 1973, and very important during the War of 1812.

Historic Landmarks
 Indian Creek Covered Bridge
 Rehoboth Church
 Laurel Creek Covered Bridge

Education
Monroe County Schools operates public schools:
 James Monroe High School
 Mountain View Elementary/Middle School
 Peterstown Middle School
 Peterstown Elementary School

Farmers' Day
Farmers' Day is an annual event, held on the first Saturday in June in Union, to recognize the farming families in the surrounding area. The event, founded by Louie H. Peters, fills the weekend, with a Friday dance, a 3k run, a Saturday pancake breakfast, Sunday activities, and a parade held in the town of Union.

Communities

Towns
 Alderson (part)
 Peterstown
 Union (county seat)

Magisterial districts
 Central
 Eastern
 Western

Unincorporated communities

 Ballard
 Ballengee
 Bozoo
 Cashmere
 Cloverdale
 Crimson Springs
 Elmhurst
 Gap Mills
 Gates
 Glace
 Greenville
 Hillsdale
 Hollywood
 Keenan
 Knobs
 Laurel Branch
 Lillydale
 Lindside
 Monitor
 Pickaway
 Raines Corner
 Red Sulphur Springs
 Rock Camp
 Salt Sulphur Springs
 Sarton
 Secondcreek
 Sinks Grove
 Sweet Springs
 Waiteville
 Wayside
 Wikel
 Wolfcreek
 Zenith

See also
 Moncove Lake State Park
 National Register of Historic Places listings in Monroe County, West Virginia
 Bluestone Lake Wildlife Management Area

References

External links
 http://www.monroewvhistory.org/

 
1799 establishments in Virginia
Populated places established in 1799
Counties of Appalachia
Former counties of Virginia